Chaillé-les-Marais is a commune in the Vendée department in the region of Pays de la Loire, western France.

See also
Communes of the Vendée department

References

Communes of Vendée